Ndau may refer to:
 Ndau people
 Ndau language

Language and nationality disambiguation pages